is a private junior college in Kurashiki, Okayama, Japan. The junior college opened in April 1951 as a women's college. It became coeducational in 2000.

See also 
 List of junior colleges in Japan

References

External links 
  

Educational institutions established in 1951
Japanese junior colleges
1951 establishments in Japan
Universities and colleges in Okayama Prefecture
Private universities and colleges in Japan